Black Box is a compilation album by John Zorn's band Naked City featuring Yamatsuka Eye on vocals. The album is a collection of the "hardcore miniatures" from Naked City and Grand Guignol that were originally released on Torture Garden in 1990 and the extended piece Leng Tch'e which was only released in Japan in 1992. This compilation was released on Tzadik Records in 1996.

Track listing 
Disc One:
 "Blood is Thin" – 1:00
 "Demon Sanctuary" – 0:38
 "Thrash Jazz Assassin" – 0:45
 "Dead Spot" – 0:31
 "Bonehead" – 0:51
 "Speedball" – 0:37
 "Blood Duster" – 0:13
 "Pile Driver" – 0:33
 "Shangkuan Ling-Feng" – 1:14
 "Numbskull" – 0:29
 "Perfume Of A Critic's Burning Flesh" – 0:24
 "Jazz Snob Eat Shit" – 0:24
 "The Prestidigitator" – 0:43
 "No Reason To Believe" – 0:26
 "Hellraiser" – 0:39
 "Torture Garden" – 0:35
 "Slan" – 0:23
 "Hammerhead" – 0:08
 "The Ways Of Pain" – 0:31
 "The Noose" – 0:10
 "Sack Of Shit" – 0:43
 "Blunt Instrument" – 0:53
 "Osaka Bondage" – 1:14
 "Igneous Ejaculation" – 0:20
 "Shallow Grave" – 0:40
 "Ujaku" – 0:27
 "Kaoru" – 0:50
 "Dead Dread" – 0:45
 "Billy Liar" – 0:10
 "Victims Of Torture" – 0:22
 "Speedfreaks" – 0:29
 "New Jersey Scum Swamp" – 0:41
 "S & M Sniper" – 0:14
 "Pigfucker" – 0:23
 "Cairo Chop Shop" – 0:22
 "Fuck The Facts" – 0:11
 "Obeah Man" – 0:17
 "Facelifter" – 0:34
 "N.Y. Flat Top Box" – 0:43
 "Whiplash" – 0:19
 "The Blade" – 0:36
 "Gob Of Spit" – 0:18
Disc Two:
 "Leng Tch'e" – 31:39
All compositions by Naked City
 Recorded in Brooklyn, New York City, and Tokyo 1989–1990 except for 'Leng Tch'e' Recorded on January 11, 1992

Personnel 
 Joey Baron – drums
 Yamatsuka Eye – vocals
 Bill Frisell – guitar
 Fred Frith – bass
 Wayne Horvitz – keyboards
 John Zorn – alto saxophone, vocals, producer, executive producer
 Martin Bisi – engineer
 Anthony Lee – design
 Bob Ludwig – mastering
 Macioce – rephotography
 Roger Moutenot – engineer, mixing
 David Newgarden – associate producer
 Seigen Ono – engineer
 Maruo Suehiro – illustrations
 Kazunori Sugiyama – associate producer
 Kimsu Theiler – cover design
 Arai Yasunori – cover design

References 

Naked City (band) albums
Albums produced by John Zorn
John Zorn compilation albums
1997 compilation albums
Tzadik Records compilation albums